Sasha Azmi (born 15 August 2001) is a Malaysian cricketer. She made her Women's Twenty20 International (WT20I) debut for Malaysia on 3 June 2018, in the 2018 Women's Twenty20 Asia Cup.
In October 2022, she played for Malaysia in Women's Twenty20 Asia Cup.

References

External links
 

2001 births
Living people
Orang Asli
Malaysian women cricketers
Malaysia women Twenty20 International cricketers
Southeast Asian Games medalists in cricket
Southeast Asian Games bronze medalists for Malaysia
Competitors at the 2017 Southeast Asian Games